The Singers And Harp Players Are Dumb is the debut album by Hwyl Nofio.

Track listing
"Black River" – 3:03
"Jerusalem Lane" – 7:58
"Luminous Is An Autumn Sunset" – 6:26
"Gravitate To The Green Hut" – 10:24
"The Song Tide Wanes And Goes" – 5:06
"Angel Tits" – 5:47
"The Singers And Harp Players Are Dumb" – 6:31
"The Somnambulist" – 5:30
"Glass Floor No Door" – 2:55
The album contains an untitled track at the end

Personnel
Steve Parry:  guitar, prepared piano, tapes, keyboards, percussion, ebow, church organ
Trevor Stainsby (musician)|Trevor Stainsby: effects, programming
Fredrik Soegaard (musician)|Fredrik Soegaard: fractal guitar
Sandor Szabo (musician)|Sandor Szabo: ambimorph guitar
Balazs Major (musician)|Balazs Major: percussion, drums

References

External links
.
 Allmusic

1999 debut albums
Hwyl Nofio albums